Gary Smith (born 28 May 1991) is a Scottish footballer who plays as a striker for Rutherglen Glencairn in the Scottish Junior Football Association, West Region. He has previously played in the Scottish Premier League and Europa League for Motherwell.

Club career

Motherwell
Smith was signed by the Motherwell from Queens Park after he impressed the youth coaches. He was immediately drafted into the under-19 squad and made an immediate impression in the 2009-10 season, finishing as top-scorer as the Motherwell under-19 team finished second. In September 2010, Smith made his professional debut against Breiðablik of Iceland in the Europa League, a match in which the Steelmen won 1-0.

Smith then made his league debut as a substitute in a 4-0 loss to Dundee United.

On 11 May 2012, Smith was released at the end of his contract, becoming a free agent.

Dumbarton (loan)
On 28 August, Smith was loaned out to Dumbarton for six-months in order to get regular first-team football. He made his debut for The Sons in a 6-0 defeat to East Fife, and made his first start in a 3-1 home defeat to Brechin City.  He returned to Motherwell after his loan at Dumbarton came to an end in January.

Stenhousemuir (loan)
On 19 January 2012, Smith joined Second Division club Stenhousemuir on an initial one-month loan, that was later extended by a further month after Smith had scored 3 goals in 3 matches.

Juniors
After his release from Motherwell, Smith trained with Airdrie but suffered knee ligament damage in pre-season. He signed for Junior side Shettleston on his recovery, before moving on to Arthurlie in June 2013. Smith joined Rutherglen Glencairn in June 2017.

References

External links
 Gary Smith profile at Motherwell FC official website
 

1991 births
Living people
Scottish footballers
Footballers from Glasgow
Queen's Park F.C. players
Motherwell F.C. players
Dumbarton F.C. players
Stenhousemuir F.C. players
Glasgow United F.C. players
Arthurlie F.C. players
Rutherglen Glencairn F.C. players
Scottish Football League players
Scottish Junior Football Association players
Association football forwards